Couchman is a surname. Notable people with the surname include:

Couchman (Kent cricketer), 18th-century English cricketer
Elizabeth Couchman (1876–1982), Australian political activist
Henry Couchman, 18th-century English architect and landscape gardener
Hugh Couchman, Canadian astronomer
James Couchman (born 1942), British politician
John Couchman (1913–2004), British rower
Peter Couchman (born 1941), Australian journalist and writer
Walter Couchman (1905–1981), British Royal Navy admiral
Martin Couchman OBE (born 1947), Hotelier of sorts